Khubostan (also Romanized as Khūbostān; also known as Ābastan, and Ābestān) is a village in Garmeh-ye Jonubi Rural District, in the Central District of Meyaneh County, East Azerbaijan Province, Iran. At the 2006 census, its population was 591, in 105 families.

References 

Populated places in Meyaneh County